The 2010 IIHF World Championship was the 74th IIHF World Championship, an annual international ice hockey tournament. It took place between 7 and 23 May 2010 in Germany. The games were played in the Lanxess Arena in Cologne, SAP Arena in Mannheim, and one game at Veltins-Arena in Gelsenkirchen. The Russian team was the defending champion, having won the previous two championships.

The Czech Republic, after an early 2–3 upset loss to Norway in the preliminary round, ultimately claimed their sixth world championship title by defeating defending champions, two years running, Russia, 2–1 in the final. Sweden won against Germany 3–1 for the bronze medal.

Canada, which three months earlier, had won the 2010 Winter Olympics Men's Ice Hockey Gold on home-ice in Vancouver, after beating the Russians 7–3 in the Quarterfinals, had a disappointing tournament. They clinched the last spot in the playoff round and lost their quarterfinal 2–5 in a rematch versus Russia. They finished 7th overall, their second-worst finish in tournament history, after their 1992 8th-place finish.

It also was a considerable success regarding attendance for the tournament; it ranked as the second most attended ice hockey world championship of all time, narrowly behind the 2004 edition. In total 548,788 people attended, compared with 552,097 in 2004 in the Czech Republic. It since slipped to the fourth place, behind 2014 and 2015 editions.

The host nation of Germany had their best finish at the tournament since it switched to the current 16 nation format, and a player representing Germany (goaltender Dennis Endras) was named MVP for the first time in the history of the championship.

Summary

Preliminary round
Group A saw the higher seeded team win each match, with the exception of the game between Belarus and Slovakia which was won by Slovakia. Russia topped the group with the full nine points, Slovakia qualified in second and Belarus in third. Kazakhstan was sent to the relegation round, after being promoted to the finals tournament for the first time since 2006.

In Group B the higher seeded team won each match, with the exception of the final group match which saw Switzerland defeat the second-seeded Canadians for the first time in the history of the tournament. This upset led to Switzerland winning the group with nine points, followed by Canada in second and Latvia in third. Italy, back at the finals tournament after missing 2009, lost all its matches and was returned to the relegation round.

Group C action ended with three teams having a record of two wins and one defeat. Norway's upset defeat of Czech Republic caused a controversy when Jaromír Jágr, a famous member of the Czech team, spoke out against other Czech stars turning down the tournament. This later triggered an international hockey dispute, when a column was posted on IIHF.com regarding these comments and about players' turning down invitations to attend. This article was later taken down and René Fasel, president of the IIHF, noted his concern. Sweden, the Czech Republic and Norway all moved on to the qualification round, while France was sent to the relegation after failing to win any matches.

In Group D the opening game saw the first major upset. Germany in front of a record crowd of over 77,000 persons defeated the United States in overtime, 2–1. This group proved to be full of upsets; in the next match Denmark beat the fourth-seeded Finns, followed by the Danes defeating the Americans. Finland came up with two wins to top the group and move on to the qualification round, along with Germany in second place and Denmark in third. The final match between the U.S. and Finland determined the United States' last-place finish, and they were sent to the relegation round for the first time since 2003.

Qualification round

Group E action first saw Denmark handing favored Slovakia a blowout upset, 6–0. In the next match Finland defeated Belarus, 2–0, after outshooting them 32 to 18. Russia narrowly defeated Germany 3–2, in which Alexander Ovechkin scored the winner. Russia continued with two more wins over Denmark and Finland to propel them to the group win, making them the only team to go undefeated into the playoff round. Belarus defeated Germany in overtime, and then defeated Denmark 2–1, but this was not enough to qualify and they ended in fifth place. In yet another upset, the host Germans defeated Slovakia 2–1 to win a qualifying spot in third place, much to the delight of the German fans and coach Uwe Krupp. Finland finished in second-place after Russia, followed by Germany and Denmark. Denmark managed to qualify for the quarter-finals for the first time in the history of the tournament. Slovakia finished a disappointing last, marking the third straight year in which they did not qualify for the quarter-finals in the lead up to their hosting of the 2011 IIHF World Championship.

Group F opened with Canada flexing its offense against Norway in a 12–1 blowout. Sweden then defeated Latvia 4–2, followed by Switzerland continuing its winning streak with an upset 3–2 win against the Czechs. Latvia defeated Norway but later lost to the Czech Republic, which resulted in their last placement in the group and their failure to qualify. Sweden beat Canada after an impressive performance by Swedish goaltender Jonas Gustavsson. In another upset, Norway managed to beat the in-form Swiss 3–2, but they would end in fifth place. The Czech Republic won against Canada 3–2 to lead them to finish ahead of the Canadians in the group. Sweden capped off the round with a convincing 5–0 win over Switzerland to finish as group winners. Switzerland finished in second after Sweden, followed by the Czech Republic. Canada, somewhat surprisingly as the second seed, grabbed the last qualifying spot in fourth place.

Relegation round

In the relegation round (Group G) the teams from the U.S., France, the newly promoted Italy and Kazakhstan faced each other after they had ended their respective preliminary groups in fourth and last place. The U.S. beat Kazakhstan in the first game 10–0, while France won against Italy in the decisive match for second place. There were no surprises on the second game-day, with the U.S. defeating France and Italy winning against Kazakhstan. The U.S. then defeated Italy in a shootout and France beat Kazakhstan 5–3. The final relegation results saw Kazakhstan and Italy go directly back down to Division I. Group-winners U.S. and second-placed France both qualified for the 2011 World Championships.

Playoff round
The playoff round saw the top eight teams competing for the title of 2010 world champions. The quarter-finals began with a close match between Finland and the Czech Republic. After Petri Kontiola's early goal in the first minute, the game remained scoreless all the way into the third period. Jakub Klepiš scored the equalizer shortly after the final period started. No further goals were scored, so the game went into a scoreless overtime followed by a shootout. Jan Marek scored the decisive goal to put the Czechs into the semifinals.

In the second quarter-final, Sweden faced Denmark. This was Denmark's first appearance in the playoff round. After Sweden established a comfortable 3–0 lead, the Danes scored a goal in the second period. Seven minutes before the end Linus Omark scored a goal which restored the three-goal lead for Sweden. A late power play goal by Dane Morten Madsen was to no avail and Sweden won 4–2.

The third quarter-final featured a storied and contentious rivalry. Russia played against Canada in a repeat of the quarter-finals at the 2010 Olympics, in which Canada embarrassed the Russians 7–3. The opening period was a dead heat until a late goal by Maxim Afinogenov. Russia, still undefeated at the tournament, immediately overtook Canada in the second period, and led at one point in the third period by 4–0. Ilya Kovalchuk had a three-assist game and was a big boost for the Russians who won 5–2, following two late Canadian goals.

The final quarter-final was an evening game between the host Germany and their traditional rival, Switzerland. The first period was scoreless but not without chances, as the Swiss hit the post twice. Midway through the second period Philip Gogulla scored on the power play to give Germany the lead, and this goal would turn out to be the game winner. The Swiss outshot the Germans 41 to 27, and Dennis Endras is credited with keeping Germany in the game by preserving the one-goal lead. The win put Germany in the semifinals for the first time since 1953 and the match was dubbed by the IIHF as The Miracle at Mannheim. At the end of the match there was a brawl between the teams, which included German assistant coach Ernst Höfner getting into an altercation with Swiss defenceman Timo Helbling. Both were handed match suspensions.

After one day off the semifinals started with Sweden versus the Czech Republic. The first period was equal with both teams scoring one goal. Andreas Engqvist scored midway through the second period to put Sweden up 2–1. This lead held into very late in the third period. With 1:13 left in the third period the Czechs pulled their goalie to get a six on five opportunity and Karel Rachůnek scored the 2–2 equalizer with just 7.5 seconds left, putting the game into overtime. The overtime period stayed scoreless and it came down to the shootout. In a repeat of the quarter-final the Czechs won by a goal from Jan Marek.

The other semifinal between Germany and Russia was a close match, much like their qualification round game. The Germans started off the scoring with a goal from Marcel Goc during a two-man power play. At the midway point of the match Evgeni Malkin scored to tie up the game for the Russians. The remainder of the game was very close, and the tie was only broken with 1:50 minutes left, when Pavel Datsyuk scored the game-winning goal. The Germans pressed in the final minutes but the score held for a 2–1 Russian victory, putting them in the final for the third straight year.

The bronze medal game was between Sweden and the surprise semifinalists, hosts Germany. Magnus Pääjärvi-Svensson scored an early goal to put up Sweden 1–0. The game then went scoreless until late in the second period when on a 4–3 rush Alexander Barta managed to retrieve his own rebound and put it top-shelf past Jonas Gustavsson, tying up the game for Germany. Early in the third period Jonas Andersson fired a shot from a very tight angle which managed to beat Dennis Endras on the five hole. The score held until Andersson netted an empty-net goal to ensure Sweden's 3–1 victory, giving them their second straight bronze medal at the worlds.

Final

The final was played between Russia and the Czech Republic for the first time in the history of the tournament, although the predecessors of both these nations, the USSR and Czechoslovakia, had met several times in the 1960s, 70s, and 80s. It was Russia's third consecutive finals appearance, and the Czech Republic's first appearance since 2006.

The match began with a goal after just 20 seconds, scored by Jakub Klepiš from a pass by Jaromír Jágr. The goal was seemingly the result of a defensive mistake which led to a Czech offensive possession with Russian defensemen out of position. For the remainder of the period the Russians held almost complete possession of the puck, and veteran Sergei Fedorov hit the post after an odd man rush. Very late in the period the Russians put the puck in the net on a power play, but it was determined to be after the clock had run out and was ruled as no goal. There was some brief confusion however, as the buzzer sounds after the clock on the scoreboard runs out.

In the second period Russia pressed once again but the Czech Republic slowed the game down and forced Russia to regroup, resulting in an error in the Russian defensive zone when Alexander Ovechkin collided with teammate Fedorov. This led to a 3-on-2 rush for the Czechs and Karel Rachůnek centered the puck while Tomáš Rolinek crashed the net. The puck was redirected off Rolinek's skates, and it was ruled a good goal because there was no kicking motion visible.

The third period began with more Russian pressure, including a close chance off the post by Evgeni Malkin, but at the midway point of the period Russian Alexei Emelin was given a five-minute major and thrown out of the game for clipping Jaromír Jágr, who did not return for the remainder of the game. This was followed by more penalty trouble for both teams. In the final minutes after pulling goaltender Semyon Varlamov, Pavel Datsyuk buried a goal on a 5-on-3 with 35 seconds left, bringing Russia within one goal of the Czechs. Under pressure the Czech goalie Tomáš Vokoun managed to stave off the final Russian assault and the Czechs held on to win the game 2–1.

The president of the Czech Republic Václav Klaus handed out the gold medals alongside IIHF president René Fasel.

Rosters

Each team's roster for the 2010 IIHF World Championship consisted of at least 15 skaters (forwards, and defencemen) and two goaltenders, and at most 20 skaters and three goaltenders. All sixteen participating nations, through the confirmation of their respective national associations, had to submit a roster by the first IIHF directorate meeting on 6 May 2010.

Host selection
Four nations, all located in Europe placed formal bids to host the 2010 IIHF World Championship. Those nations were:

Slovakia and Sweden withdrew from bidding before voting began in order to apply for the 2011 World Championship. All four nations to bid on the 2010 World Championship later received winning bids. Slovakia won the bid to host the 2011 IIHF World Championship, Sweden won its bid to host in 2012, but this decision was later switched to be the joint host of the 2012, and 2013 IIHF World Championship editions (both with Finland), and Belarus to host the 2014 IIHF World Championship.

After one round of voting, the winning bid was announced by IIHF president René Fasel on 15 May 2005, from Zürich, Switzerland. Belarus' bidding cities Minsk and Zhodzina received 18 votes to Germany's 89, thus finalizing Germany's successful bid.

  withdrew from the 2010 bid prior to the start of the congress, postponed 2011
  withdrew immediately prior to the start of the voting, postponed 2011

Promotions

Official song
The official song of the tournament is "Stuck on Replay" by the German electronic dance band Scooter. It is the fourth single from their album Under the Radar Over the Top. It was released on 12 March 2010, on the day of the Hamburg concert, the biggest show of their Under the Radar Over the Top tour.

Mascot

Urmel on Ice is the official mascot of the tournament. A character created by Max Kruse and known by the German public from the Augsburger Puppenkiste and the Impy's Island (Urmel aus dem Eis) film was previously the mascot of the Deutsche Eishockey-Bund and the German national team. He wears number 10 on his jersey.

Motto
The official motto of the tournament was unveiled on 2 September 2009, in Lanxess Arena and is "Germany on Ice".

Ambassadors

The World Championship Ambassadors for 2010 included; Canadian legend Wayne Gretzky, Soviet ice hockey goaltender and ten time World champion Vladislav Tretiak, and "Germany's ice hockey player of the century" Erich Kühnhackl. They are all members of the IIHF Hall of Fame, and have all played in the IIHF World Championship previously. They were special members, alongside; Zdeno Chára, Peter Forsberg, Sergei Kostitsyn, Jari Kurri, Kim Martin, Mark Streit, Hayley Wickenheiser and Henrik Zetterberg, of a campaign called "The Green Puck campaign", which was an anti-doping initiative in association with the World Anti-Doping Agency.

Venues

Attendance world record

The opening game of the 74th IIHF World Championship took place at Veltins-Arena in Gelsenkirchen on 7 May between Germany and the United States. On this occasion, the stadium's planned configuration would allow for a capacity of 76,152. This figure is higher than the past ice hockey attendance World Record held by Michigan State University, which was 74,554.

It was announced at the second intermission by Guinness World Records spokesman Christian Teufe, that not only had the Gelsenkirchen game passed the world record, but had exceeded it by over 3,000 individuals. The official attendance according to the IIHF, and confirmed by the Guinness World records, was 77,803. Both Eric Nystrom and David Moss, who were playing for the United States, had also played in the Michigan State game in 2001, making them the only people to have played both world record games.

The noise inside the stadium was considerably loud, due to the German ice hockey chants, whistles and drums, which according to Ryan Carter of Team USA left the Americans frustrated at the inability to communicate. Carter also said that the "crowd was definitely the seventh man in this game for Germany". Also notable about the game was that it was the first time in over 17 years of international hockey competition that Germany had defeated the United States, with Felix Schütz scoring the game winner in overtime, on Scott Clemmensen, for a 2–1 final score. The previous win was on 25 April 1993, also in Germany in Dortmund, during the 1993 World Championship when Germany beat the United States 6–3.

The President of Germany, Horst Köhler, along with other politicians were present for the match.

The overall attendance record was broken in December 2010 by The Big Chill at the Big House, though the crowd still remains the largest ever for an indoor hockey game.

Nations
The following 16 nations qualified for the elite-pool tournament. One nation from Asia, 13 nations from Europe, and two nations from North America were represented.

Asia

Europe

North America

Seeding and grouping

The seeding in the preliminary round was based on the 2009 IIHF World Ranking, which ends at the conclusion of the 2009 IIHF World Championship. The 2010 Olympics were therefore not included. The teams were grouped by seeding (in parenthesis is the corresponding world ranking):

Group A
 (1)
 (8)
 (9)
 (18)

Group B
 (2)
 (7)
 (10)
 (15)

Group C
 (3)
 (6)
 (11)
 (14)

Group D
 (4)
 (5)
 (12)
 (13)

Preliminary round
Sixteen participating teams were placed in the following four groups. After playing a round-robin, the top three teams in each group advanced to the qualifying round. The last team in each group competes in the relegation round.

Groups A and D played in Cologne, with one game in Gelsenkirchen, and groups B and C played in Mannheim.

Group A 

All times are local (UTC+2).

Group B 

All times are local (UTC+2).

Group C 

All times are local (UTC+2).

Group D 

All times are local (UTC+2).

Qualification round 
The top three teams from each group of the preliminary round advanced to the qualifying round. They were placed into two groups: teams from Groups A and D were placed into Group E, while teams from Groups B and C were placed into Group F.

Every team kept the points from preliminary round matches against teams who also advanced. The teams played a single round robin, but did not play against teams which they had already met in preliminary groups.

The top four teams in both groups E and F advanced to the playoff round.

Group E 

All times are local (UTC+2).

Group F 

All times are local (UTC+2).

Relegation round 
The bottom team in the standings from each group of the preliminary round played in the relegation round. The bottom two teams in the relegation round moved down to Division 1 for the 2011 World Championship.

Group G 

All times are local (UTC+2).

Playoff round

Bracket

Quarter-finals 
All times are local (UTC+2).

Quarterfinals in Cologne were scheduled to be the pairs 1E–4F and 2E–3F, and in Mannheim the pairs 1F–4E and 2F–3E.

Semi-finals 
All times are local (UTC+2).

Pairs were the winner of 1E–4F vs. the winner of 2F–3E and 1F–4E vs. 2E–3F.

Bronze medal game 
Time is local (UTC+2).

Gold medal game 
Time is local (UTC+2).

Ranking and statistics

Tournament awards
 Best players selected by the directorate:
 Best Goaltender:  Dennis Endras
 Best Defenceman:  Petteri Nummelin
 Best Forward:  Pavel Datsyuk
 Most Valuable Player:  Dennis Endras
Media All-Star Team:
 Goaltender:  Dennis Endras
 Defence: ,  Christian Ehrhoff,  Petteri Nummelin
 Forwards:  Pavel Datsyuk,  Evgeni Malkin,  Magnus Pääjärvi-Svensson

Final standings
The final standings of the tournament according to IIHF:

Scoring leaders
List shows the top skaters sorted by points, then goals. If the list exceeds 10 skaters because of a tie in points, all of the tied skaters are shown.
GP = Games played; G = Goals; A = Assists; Pts = Points; +/− = Plus/minus; PIM = Penalties in minutes; POS = PositionSource: IIHF.com02:45, 24 May 2010 (UTC)

Leading goaltenders
Only the top five goaltenders, based on save percentage, who have played 40% of their team's minutes are included in this list.
TOI = Time On Ice (minutes:seconds); SA = Shots against; GA = Goals against; GAA = Goals against average; Sv% = Save percentage; SO = ShutoutsSource: IIHF.comUpdated: 02:48, 24 May 2010 (UTC)

Officials
The IIHF selected 16 referees and 16 linesmen to work the 2010 IIHF World Championship. They are the following:

Referees
 Vladimír Baluška
 Ole Stian Hansen
 Rafael Kadyrov
 Daniel Konc
 Tom Laaksonen
 Jari Levonen
 Rick Looker
 Milan Minář

Referees
 Marc Muylaert
 Konstantin Olenin
 Sören Persson
 Daniel Piechaczek
 Chris Savage
 Vladimír Šindler
 Patrik Sjöberg
 Tom Sterns

Linesmen
 Roger Arm
 Daniel Bechard
 Eric Bouguin
 David Brown
 Ivan Dedioulia
 Ansis Eglītis
 Thomas Gemeinhardt
 Konstantin Gordenko

Linesmen
 František Kalivoda
 Christian Kaspar
 Andreas Kowert
 Peter Sabelström
 Anton Semjonov
 Jussi Terho
 Miroslav Valach
 Tobias Wehrli

IIHF broadcasting rights 
The IIHF sold the rights for the broadcast of 2010 IIHF World Championship to the following countries.

References

External links 

 

 
IIHF World Championship
1
2009–10 in German ice hockey
World
2010
May 2010 sports events in Germany
2010s in North Rhine-Westphalia
2010s in Baden-Württemberg
Sports competitions in Gelsenkirchen
Sports competitions in Mannheim
21st century in Gelsenkirchen
21st century in Mannheim